Felimare ruthae is a colourful species of sea slug or dorid nudibranch, a marine gastropod mollusk in the family Chromodorididae.

Distribution
This nudibranch is known from the Caribbean. and the Gulf of Mexico.

Description
Felimare ruthae has a blue-black body with a yellow-lined mantle and yellow longitudinal lines and bright-blue striations on its dorsum. The gills are typically translucent outlined with black and the rhinophores are black with a yellow-white line running vertically.

This species can reach a total length of at least 25 mm and has been observed feeding on the sponge Dysidea etheria.

Habitat 

References

Chromodorididae
Gastropods described in 1974